Salvation Nell is a 1921 American silent drama film produced by Whitman Bennett and distributed by Associated First National Pictures, later First National Pictures. It was directed by Kenneth Webb and stars Pauline Starke. The film is based on a successful 1908 Broadway play by Edward Sheldon that starred Minnie Maddern Fiske.

This film survives in the George Eastman House and the Library of Congress collections.

An earlier 1915 version with Beatriz Michelena is now lost. A 1931 talkie version made by Tiffany Pictures survives.

Cast
Pauline Starke as Nell Saunders
Joe King as Jim Platt (credited as Joseph King)
Gypsy O'Brien as Myrtle Hawes
Edward Langford as Major Williams
Evelyn Carter Carrington as Hallelujah (credited as Evelyn C. Carrington)
Maggie  
Charles McDonald as Sid McGovern
Matthew Betz as Al McGovern
Marie Haynes as Hash House Sal
Arthur Earle as Giffen (credited as A. Earl)
William Nally as Callahan
Lawrence Johnson as Jimmie

References

External links

1921 films
American silent feature films
Films based on works by Edward Sheldon
Films directed by Kenneth Webb
First National Pictures films
1921 drama films
Silent American drama films
American black-and-white films
1920s American films